The 2011 Ford FAI Cup Final was the 88th final of the FAI Cup, the oldest domestic football competition in Ireland. The match took place on 6 November 2011 at Aviva Stadium in Dublin for the second consecutive year. The two clubs contesting the 2011 final were Premier Division side, Sligo Rovers and First Division side, Shelbourne, with the victors guaranteeing a berth in the UEFA Europa League. The 2011 final was Sligo Rovers tenth and Shelbourne's eighteenth FAI Cup Final in their 116 years of existence.
The game took place on Sunday, 6 November 2011 at 3.30pm local time. The match was aired live on RTÉ Two from 3pm to 6.40pm. Sligo retained the cup after a four one win in a penalty shoot-out.

Background
For Sligo Rovers, it was their 3rd final in row. Sligo Rovers won the last cup final in 2010, beating Shamrock Rovers on penalties 2–0,having lost the 2009 final 2-1 to the now defunct Sporting Fingal.
The last time Shelbourne reached the final was in 2000, the game in which they beat Bohemians F.C. to win the cup. Rovers have a total of 3 titles and Shels have a total of 7 titles.

Pre-match

Officials
Wicklow-based referee Richie Winter was named as the referee for the 2011 FAI Cup Final on 25 October 2011. Winter's previous assignments in the FAI Cup Final included a position as fourth official for the 2008 FAI Cup Final.

His assistants for the 2011 final were Mark Gavin from Kildare, Dermot Broughton from Limerick, with Graham Kelly of Cork as the fourth official.

Kits
Since both sides' first-choice kits are red, the toss off a coin was used to decide which team had choice of kit. Shelbourne won the toss and wore their home kit of red shirt and white shorts, while Sligo Rovers wore their away kit of white shirts and white shorts.

Match

Details

See also
2011 FAI Cup
2011 League of Ireland Cup Final

References

External links
In Pictures: 2011 FAI Ford Cup final

FAI Cup finals
Final
Fai Cup Final 2011
Fai Cup Final 2011
Fai Cup Final 2011
FAI Cup Final, 2011
FAI Cup Final